Drepatelodes ostenta is a moth in the Apatelodidae family. It was described by Schaus in 1905.

References

Natural History Museum Lepidoptera generic names catalog

Apatelodidae
Moths described in 1905